Mehmet Cem Kozlu (born 1946, Istanbul) is a Turkish businessman, politician and writer. He was the CEO of Turkish Airlines before joining the Motherland Party and becoming an MP.

Early and personal life 
Kozlu was born in 1946 in Istanbul. He went to the Denison University, Stanford University and Boğaziçi University.
Kozlu is married and has two children.

Career 
Kozlu was the CEO of Turkish Airlines from 1988 to 1991. During his time in this position, the management approach of the airline changed to give more importance to IT. After leaving, he became an MP at the 19th Parliament of Turkey for the Motherland Party. From 1997 to 2003, he returned to Turkish Airlines and became the chairman of the board. He later worked at The Coca-Cola Company in several positions before retiring in 2006. Kozlu has written 9 books.

References

External links 

1946 births
Living people
Businesspeople from Istanbul
Turkish Airlines
Members of the 19th Parliament of Turkey